End All Life Productions is a French record label that released many black metal albums in the late 1990s and the 2000s.

Catalogue

See also
 List of record labels

External links
 End All Life Productions website
 End All Life Productions at Discogs

French independent record labels
Black metal record labels